Ronan Hughes (born 15 December 1998) is a Scottish professional footballer who plays for East Kilbride as a midfielder.

Club career
Hughes turned professional with Hamilton Academical in January 2015. He had first joined the club at the age of 10, and played for them every youth level. He made his senior debut on 11 May 2016. He moved on loan to Stirling Albion in September 2018.

In June 2019 he signed a contract extension with Hamilton, until summer 2020. He scored his first goals for Hamilton when he scored twice in a 5-3 defeat to St Johnstone on 17 October 2020.

He returned to Stirling Albion on loan in January 2020.

He was released by Hamilton at the end of his contract in May 2022, signing for East Kilbride in June 2022.

International career
Born in Scotland, and involved in national training squads at under-14 level but never capped for higher age groups, Hughes is also eligible to play for Wales at international level through his father's origins.

Career statistics

References

1998 births
Living people
Scottish footballers
Hamilton Academical F.C. players
East Kilbride F.C. players
Stirling Albion F.C. players
Scottish Professional Football League players
Association football midfielders
Scottish people of Welsh descent
Lowland Football League players